Kristina Wagner (born Kristina Kay Crump; October 30, 1962) is an American actress. She is sometimes credited by the name Kristina Malandro. She is best known for her role as Felicia Jones on the ABC soap opera General Hospital. She also briefly had a small role on the ABC series Hotel in the late 1980s.

Career 
On September 7, 1984, Kristina Wagner got her big break when she was cast as Felicia Cummings on General Hospital as the spirited Aztec princess. She became half of the 80's super couple Frisco and Felicia, whose on-screen chemistry was real and undeniable. She appeared in the role on a contract basis until 2003. After a brief departure, she returned to the series in a recurring capacity in 2004. In May 2005, however, Wagner asked ABC to place her back on contract status for an important storyline involving her character. After ABC refused, Wagner walked, and she was replaced briefly by former Another World actress Sandra Ferguson. Upon Ferguson's departure in 2005, the character was absent from the show until late 2007, when Wagner again returned for a month-long stint.

In 2012, it was announced that Wagner would once again reprise the role of Felicia, with a first airing on April 27 that year.

In 2013, it was announced that Wagner was releasing a documentary, Children of Internment, which she produced and directed with her brother, Joe Crump. The documentary concerns the events surrounding the American internment of German-Americans during World War II. The documentary won Best Documentary at the Santa Fe Film Festival.

Wagner appeared as Nora Avery alongside her ex-husband, actor Jack Wagner, on the Hallmark Channel's When Calls the Heart.

At age 54, Wagner posed in a bikini for the first time ever for the cover of First for Women.

In 2019, Wagner celebrated her 35-year journey with General Hospital, recounting how the journey affected both her professional and personal life.

In late 2021, Wagner was placed back under contract at General Hospital after 18 years downgraded to recurring.

Personal life 
Wagner is a native of Indianapolis, Indiana.

After privately dating, Malandro went public about her relationship with her General Hospital co-star, Jack Wagner, when she announced her pregnancy in 1990. Kristina and Jack Wagner eventually wed on December 18, 1993, in a private ceremony in Lake Tahoe. Citing irreconcilable differences, they filed for divorce in February 2001. After two years apart, the Wagners announced that they were working through their problems and privately reconciling; they publicized their news of formal reconciliation in 2004. However, in 2005, the Wagners once again filed for divorce, which was finalized the following year. The couple had two sons born in 1990 and 1994. Their younger son died in Los Angeles on June 6, 2022. On June 13, 2022, Wagner and former husband Jack announced that their youngest son died after losing his battle with addiction. The couple have since created a scholarship fund in honour of their son. All funds donated to the Harrison Wagner Scholarship Fund will be used to directly help young men pay their rent or a portion of their rent who could not otherwise afford their care at New Life House (a sober living facility in California).

After her divorce, she decided to go back to college and attended California State University, Northridge where she majored in history.  In her senior year, she began working on what became the Children of Internment documentary.

A self-proclaimed adventurous type, Wagner loves camping, river rafting and mountaineering, as well as ice skating, swimming and gymnastics.

Filmography

References

External links

1962 births
Living people
American soap opera actresses
American television actresses
Actresses from Indianapolis
National Sprint Car Hall of Fame inductees
20th-century American actresses
21st-century American actresses